FAU Baseball Stadium is a baseball venue located in Boca Raton, Florida, United States. It has been home to the Florida Atlantic Owls baseball team of the NCAA Division I Conference USA since 1991. The venue has a capacity of 2,000 spectators and features Triple-A-quality lighting.

Attendance record
On April 16, 2008, the Owls were defeated at FAU Baseball Stadium by the then-#1 ranked Miami Hurricanes. The 2,348 spectators in attendance set a stadium record.

Features
The venue features a berm seating area, which allows for increased capacity, down each foul line.

Praise and criticism
In 2012, college baseball writer Eric Sorenson ranked the stadium as the fifth best small venue in Division I baseball.

Others, including players and coaches from the program, have criticized the facility's poor conditions.

See also
 List of NCAA Division I baseball venues

References

College baseball venues in the United States
Florida Atlantic Owls baseball
Baseball venues in Florida
Sports venues in Boca Raton, Florida
Sports venues completed in 1991
1991 establishments in Florida